= Alexandriysky =

Alexandriysky is the name of the following places

- Alexandriysky Selsoviet (Georgiyevsky District)
- Александрийский сельсовет (Благодарненский район)
- Александрийский сельсовет (Дагестан)
- Александрийский сельсовет (Могилёвская область)
- Alexandriysky Uyezd, a county-level subdivision of the Russian Empire
